Events in the year 1970 in Mexico.

Incumbents

Federal government
 President: Gustavo Díaz Ordaz (until 30 November), Luis Echeverría (starting 1 December)
 Interior Secretary (SEGOB): Mario Moya Palencia
 Secretary of Foreign Affairs (SRE): Antonio Carrillo Flores/Emilio Óscar Rabasa
 Communications Secretary (SCT): José Antonio Padilla Segura/Eugenio Méndez Docurro
 Education Secretary (SEP): Agustín Yáñez/Víctor Bravo Ahuja
 Secretary of Defense (SEDENA): Matías Ramos
 Secretary of Navy: Antonio Vázquez del Mercado/Luis M. Bravo Carrera
 Secretary of Labor and Social Welfare: Salomón González Blanco/Rafael Hernández Ochoa
 Secretary of Welfare: Gilberto Valenzuela/Luis Enrique Bracamontes

Supreme Court

 President of the Supreme Court: Alfonso Guzmán Neyra

Governors

 Aguascalientes: Francisco Guel Jiménez 
 Baja California: Raúl Sánchez Díaz Martell
 Campeche: Carlos Sansores Pérez
 Chiapas: José Castillo Tielemans/Manuel Velasco Suárez
 Chihuahua: Oscar Flores Sánchez
 Coahuila: Eulalio Gutiérrez Treviño
 Colima: Pablo Silva García
 Durango: Alejandro Páez Urquidi 
 Guanajuato: Manuel M. Moreno
 Guerrero: Caritino Maldonado Pérez
 Hidalgo: Manuel Sánchez Vite/Donaciano Serna Leal
 Jalisco: Francisco Medina Ascencio/Alberto Orozco Romero
 State of Mexico: Carlos Hank González
 Michoacán: Carlos Gálvez Betancourt/Servando Chávez Hernández
 Morelos
Emilio Riva Palacio (PRI), until May 18
Felipe Rivera Crespo (PRI), starting May 18
 Nayarit: Roberto Gómez Reyes
 Nuevo León: Eduardo Elizondo
 Oaxaca: Víctor Bravo Ahuja/Fernando Gómez Sandoval
 Puebla: Rafael Moreno Valle
 Querétaro: Juventino Castro Sánchez
 San Luis Potosí: Antonio Rocha Cordero
 Sinaloa: Alfredo Valdés Montoya
 Sonora: Faustino Félix Serna
 Tabasco: Manuel R. Mora Martínez
 Tamaulipas: Manuel A. Rabize	
 Tlaxcala: Ignacio Bonillas/Crisanto Cuéllar Abaroa/Luciano Huerta Sánchez
 Veracruz: Rafael Murillo Vidal
 Yucatán: Luis Torres Mesías/Carlos Loret de Mola Mediz
 Zacatecas: Pedro Ruiz González
Regent of the Federal District
Alfonso Corona del Rosal (until July 31)
Alfonso Martínez Domínguez (starting August 1)

Events

 The Consejo Nacional de Ciencia y Tecnología founded. 
 May 23: Roman Catholic Territorial Prelature of Cancún-Chetumal established.
 July 5: 1970 Mexican general election.
 August 31 – September 5: Tropical Storm Norma.
 November 20: Metro Hospital General opens. 
 November 23: The Boundary Treaty of 1970 is signed.

Awards
Belisario Domínguez Medal of Honor – Rosendo Salazar

Film

 List of Mexican films of 1970

Sport

 1969–70 Mexican Primera División season 
 1970 Mexican Primera División season 
 1970 FIFA World Cup 
 Rojos del Águila de Veracruz win the Mexican League
 1970 Mexican Grand Prix 
 Club Universidad de Guadalajara and Club Jalisco are founded.

Births
February 16 — Nailea Norvind, actress
April 13 — Eduardo Capetillo, singer and actor
June 17 — Sasha Sokol, singer, composer, actress, and television host
September 18 — Miguel Ángel Riquelme Solís, politician (PRI) and Governor of Coahuila starting 2017
September 29 — Ninel Conde, Mexican actress, singer, and television host
October 1 — José Ignacio Peralta, Governor of Colima starting 2016
October 8 — Mayrín Villanueva, model and actress
 December 28 — Yolanda Andrade, Mexican actress and television presenter

Deaths
 October 19 – Lázaro Cárdenas, 44th President of Mexico (b. 1895)

References

External links

 
Mexico